The Party of Economic Reforms of Tajikistan (PERT;) is an officially registered centrist political party in Tajikistan. 

The Party of Economic Reforms of Tajikistan was formed on November 9, 2005, by the rector of the Transport Institute of Tajikistan, Olimjon Boboev. According to Boboev: “We have studied the programs of all parties, but the tasks that we want to implement were not found there. Therefore, we have created our party to carry out those economic reforms that we consider necessary. " The party united in its ranks mainly scientists-economists and young professionals working in various sectors of the economy.

In 2006, at the presidential election, the party nominated the leader of the party, Olimjon Boboev. The Central Election Commission of the Republic of Tajikistan officially registered Boboev as a presidential candidate. Olimjon Boboev proposed an agrarian reform, a revision of industrial policy, liberalization of the economy, as well as a solution to financial and economic problems in the country. According to the results of the elections, Boboev took a sensational second place, collecting 190 148 (6.2%) votes, letting the incumbent President of the Republic of Tajikistan - Emomali Rakhmonov, who received 79.3% of the vote.

In February 2010, PERT took part in the parliamentary election in Tajikistan for the first time. Following the elections, the party won 5.6% of the vote and entered the parliament of Tajikistan - Majlisi Oli. The party in the parliament of the country received the right to represent two representatives of PERT.

In 2013, at the presidential election in Tajikistan, the party again nominated the leader of the party, Olimjon Boboev. According to the results of the elections, Boboev took fifth place, collecting 140,733 (3.91%) votes.

In March 2015, PERT took part in the parliamentary elections in Tajikistan for the second time in its history. As a result of the elections, the party won 7.5% of the vote, taking third place, and entered the parliament of Tajikistan. The party in the country's parliament received the right to represent three representatives of the PERT.

References 

Political parties in Tajikistan